Vanessa Lee Chester (born July 2, 1984) is an American actress. She began her career as a child actor in the films A Little Princess (1995) and Harriet the Spy (1996), before her breakthrough role in Steven Spielberg's The Lost World: Jurassic Park (1997).

Biography
Chester was born on July 2, 1984 at Brooklyn, New York City, to Guyanese parents who immigrated to the United States. In her early childhood, she relocated with her mother to Los Angeles, California, where she began auditioning for and appearing in commercials.

Chester made her film debut in the comedy CB4 (1993) starring Chris Rock. The following year, she appeared in a supporting role in Alfonso Cuarón's A Little Princess (1995). In 1996, she appeared opposite Michelle Trachtenberg as Janie in the Nickelodeon film Harriet the Spy, which was a moderate box office success. The following year, she was cast in a lead role as Kelly in Steven Spielberg's The Lost World: Jurassic Park (1997), playing the daughter of Ian Malcolm (Jeff Goldblum). The film was a box office hit, grossing over $600 million worldwide. Chester later worked mostly in television, most notably appearing in Malcolm in the Middle and The West Wing. She was nominated for a Saturn Award (The Lost World: Jurassic Park), Image Award (The Lost World: Jurassic Park), Young Artist Award (A Little Princess) and took home the Young Artist Award for Best Performance in a Feature Film – Supporting Young Actress (Harriet The Spy). In early 2012, Chester began work on an unnamed film by Ty Hodges.

Filmography

Film

Television

References

External links

Actresses from New York City
Actresses from Los Angeles
American child actresses
American film actresses
American people of Guyanese descent
American television actresses
Living people
African-American actresses
20th-century American actresses
21st-century American actresses
University of Southern California alumni
20th-century African-American women
20th-century African-American people
1984 births
21st-century African-American women
21st-century African-American people